The Journal of Nonlinear Mathematical Physics (JNMP) is a mathematical journal published by Atlantis Press. It covers nonlinear problems in physics and mathematics, include applications, with topics such as quantum algebras and integrability; non-commutative geometry; spectral theory; and instanton, monopoles and gauge theory.

Abstracting and indexing 
The journal is abstracted and indexed by:
 Mathematical Reviews
 Zentralblatt MATH
 Science Citation Index Expanded
 ISI Alerting Services
 CompuMath Citation Index
 Current Contents/Physical, Chemical and Earth Sciences
 Inspec

References

External links 
 JNMP Journal Website

Mathematics journals
Publications established in 1994
English-language journals